The 2018 Conference Carolinas men's volleyball tournament is the men's volleyball tournament for Conference Carolinas during the 2018 NCAA Division I & II men's volleyball season. It is being held  April 17 through April 21, 2018 at campus sites. The winner receives the conference's automatic bid to the 2018 NCAA Volleyball Tournament.

Seeds
Eight of the nine teams are eligible for the postseason, with the highest seed hosting each round. Teams are seeded by record within the conference, with a tiebreaker system to seed teams with identical conference records. Emmanuel is ineligible as they are still transitioning from NAIA to NCAA.

Schedule and results

Bracket

References

2018 Conference Carolinas men's volleyball season
2018 NCAA Division I & II men's volleyball season
Volleyball competitions in the United States